Cape Fear is a prominent headland jutting into the Atlantic Ocean from Bald Head Island on the coast of North Carolina in the southeastern United States. It is largely formed of barrier beaches and the silty outwash of the Cape Fear River as it drains the southeast coast of North Carolina through an estuary south of Wilmington. Cape Fear is formed by the intersection of two sweeping arcs of shifting, low-lying beach, the result of longshore currents which also form the treacherous, shifting Frying Pan Shoals, part of the Graveyard of the Atlantic.

Dunes dominated by sea oats occur from the upper beach driftline back to the stable secondary dunes, where they mix with other grasses such as saltmeadow cordgrass and panic grass, as well as seaside goldenrod, spurge and other herbs to form a stable salt-tolerant grassland.

The Cape Fear estuary drains the largest watershed in North Carolina, containing 27% of the state's population.

History
Giovanni da Verrazzano, the Italian explorer sailing for France, made landfall after crossing the Atlantic at or near Cape Fear on March 1, 1524.

The name comes from the 1585 expedition of Sir Richard Grenville. Sailing to Roanoke Island, his ship became embayed behind the cape. Some of the crew were afraid they would wreck, giving rise to the name Cape Fear. It is the fifth-oldest surviving English place name in the U.S.

Cape Fear was the landing place of British General Sir Henry Clinton during the American Revolutionary War on May 3, 1775.

The 1962 film Cape Fear and its 1991 remake were set at Cape Fear (although neither movie actually was filmed there).

See also
Geography of North Carolina

References

Landforms of Brunswick County, North Carolina
Fear